Ross Jamison (born 19 March 1990 in Wales) is a former Hong Kong racing driver of British descent. He is the champion of the Formula BMW Pacific series in 2008.

Ross started racing in Formula BMW in 2007. He was one of the five scholarship winners and finished second in the Rookie Cup and fifth overall.

He continued in Formula BMW in 2008 and clinched the championship in Shanghai, with two races to spare.

Ross took part in his first ever race in Macau in 2008. He qualified 4th  and finished 16th after an accident with teammate Alex Sims at Lisboa corner.

Personal life
Ross studied at King George V School in Kowloon, Hong Kong. His father is a captain with Cathay Pacific.

References

External links
 Official website
 Jamison crowned champion in Shanghai as BMW Junior takes victory.
 Driver profile on BMW Motorsport
 
 CityKarting.com Profile

1990 births
Living people
Hong Kong racing drivers
Hong Kong people of Welsh descent
Formula BMW Asia drivers
Alumni of King George V School, Hong Kong
Team Meritus drivers
Formula BMW Pacific drivers